"So Many Ways" is a 1959 single by Brook Benton written by Bobby Stevenson. The single was Benton's third release to hit number one on the R&B singles chart in 1959. "So Many Ways" hit the number one spot for three non-consecutive weeks and was also Benton's second top ten pop hit, peaking at number six.

Chart positions

References

1959 singles
Mercury Records singles
Brook Benton songs
1959 songs
Songs written by Brook Benton